A vixen is a female fox.

Vixen may also refer to:

Characters
 Vixen (comics), a DC Comics superhero character
 Vixen (stock character), a mysterious sexually attractive woman
 Vixen, one of Santa Claus's reindeer, as named in "The Night Before Christmas"
 Vixen (Marvel Comics), a British crime lord in the Marvel UK franchise and enemy of Captain Britain and Psylocke
 Amaya Jiwe (Arrowverse), an Arrowverse character known by the alias Vixen 
 Mari McCabe (Arrowverse), an Arrowverse character known by the alias Vixen

Computing
Osborne Vixen, a 1984 personal computer
Vixen (video game), a 1988 platform game
Vixen 357, a 1992 Japanese Mega Drive strategy game
The originally intended name of the VIC-20, a 1980 home computer

Film and series
Vixen (adult film company), adult film production company based in Los Angeles, California
Vixen (web series), a 2015 web series on the DC Comics superhero character
Vixen!, a 1968 film by Russ Meyer
Vixens, a Japanese erotic OAV series
The Vixen (film), a 1916 film starring Theda Bara

Literature
VIBE Vixen, a women's magazine, spinoff of VIBE magazine
Vixen (Pham novel), a 2000 novel by Hoa Pham
Vixen 03, a Clive Cussler adventure novel
Vixen, an 1879 novel by Mary Elizabeth Braddon

Military
de Havilland Sea Vixen, a 1950s–1960s British fighter aircraft
HMS Vixen, various British Royal Navy ships
Mission of the Vixen or Seizure of the Vixen or Vixen Incident, an 1836 conflict between UK and Russia
Operation Vixen, a series of British nuclear bomb safety tests
USS Vixen, various ships in the US Navy
Vickers Vixen, a biplane produced in small numbers in the 1920s
Vixen, a prototype variant of the Fox armoured reconnaissance vehicle

Music
Megitsune (aka "Vixen") 2013 song by Babymetal
Vixen (band), an all-female hard rock band formed in 1980
Vixen (Gloria Jones album), 1976
Vixen (Vixen album), 1988
Vixen, a rock band formed in 1982 featuring Marty Friedman
"Vixen", a 1997 B-side song by Millencolin
"Vixen", a 2018 song by Vancouver Sleep Clinic

People
Jenny Ryan, one of the Chasers on the UK game show The Chase, nicknamed "The Vixen"
Lucy Vixen (born 1989), a British glamour model
 Melody Trouble Vixen, a female professional wrestler from the Gorgeous Ladies of Wrestling
Taylor Vixen, a Penthouse pet
The Vixen (drag queen) (born 1990) U.S. drag queen
Vixen, an alias of Ruth Crisp
Yvonne Ekwere (born 1987) Nigerian TV personality nicknamed "Vixen"

Places
Vixen, Louisiana, a community in the United States
Vixen Tor, a tor in Dartmoor, England, UK

Sports
Guiseley A.F.C. Vixens, an English women's football team
Leeds City Vixens L.F.C., an English women's football team
Melbourne Vixens, an Australian women's netball team
Minnesota Vixen, an American women's football team

Transportation
TVR Vixen, a hand-built sports car manufactured between 1967 and 1972
SkyStar Vixen, a kit-built airplane
Vixen (RV), a 1980s recreational vehicle, built by Vixen Motor Company
Vixen (telescopes), a Japanese astronomy equipment manufacturer
 VIXEN, the callsign of airline Sunset Aviation, see List of airline codes (S)

Other uses
AVN vixen of the year, an award for adult video
Video vixen, a female model who appears in hip-hop-oriented music videos

See also

Fox (disambiguation)